The mayor of Kathmandu is the head of the municipal executive of Kathmandu Metropolitan City. The officeholder is elected for a five-year term and limited to serving no more than two terms. The role was first created in 1932 during the Rana regime.

The current mayor is Balendra Shah, who was elected in the 2022 election and took office on 30 May 2022. The position has been held by fifteen people in a permanent capacity since its creation.

The city of Kathmandu is scrutinized by the Kathmandu Metropolitan City Municipal Assembly and the mayor is supported by the Municipal Executive which consists of ward chairs of all 32 wards of Kathmandu.

History 
Kathmandu was first declared as a municipality in 1932 after the formulation of the Kathmandu Municipality Sabal act. It was founded as a waste management department and Singh Shamsher was appointed as the first 'Mayor Man' of Kathmandu municipality in the same year by the government of Chandra Shumsher.

In 1947, the first municipal elections were held in Kathmandu. Gehendra Shumsher Thapa was appointed as the chairman of Kathmandu by the Rana regime and Shankar Dev Pant was elected as his deputy from the common people.

In the first democratic elections since the fall of the Rana regime in 1953, Janak Man Shrestha was elected as mayor of Kathmandu by the council in an indirect election and became the city's first elected mayor. After King Mahendra's coup d'teat in 1960, the position of mayor was abolished and the Pradhan Panch (Council Head) would be the elected head of Kathmandu municipality.

Kathmandu municipality was declared as a metropolitan city by mayor Prem Lal Singh in 1995 and Keshav Sthapit was elected as the first mayor of the metropolitan city in 1997.

Power and functions 
Local government in Nepal has authority over the local units pursuant to Schedule 8 of the Constitution of Nepal. The mayor derives its power from the Local Government Operation Act, 2017.

The main functions of the mayor are:

 Summon and chair meetings of the municipal assembly and the municipal executive.
 Table agendas and proposals to the municipal assembly and the municipal executive.
 Prepare and present the annual programme and budget.
 Enforce the decisions of the assembly and the executive.
 Oversee the work of committees and sub-committees of the municipality and ward committees.

The mayor of Kathmandu is also a member of the Kathmandu District Assembly, and an ex-officio member of the Pashupati Area Development Trust, the Boudhanath Area Development Committee, the senate of the National Academy of Medical Sciences and the chairman of the Valley Municipal Forum.

List of mayors

Rana regime (1932–51)

Transition period (1953–60)

Panchayat era (1966–90)

Constitutional monarchy era (1990–2008)

Federal Democratic Republic of Nepal (2017–present)

See also 

 History of Kathmandu
 Mayor of Pokhara
 Mayor of Dharan

References 

 
Lists of political office-holders in Nepal
Lists of mayors
Kathmandu